Umman Manda is a term used in the early second and first millennia BC for a poorly known people in the Ancient Near East. They have been identified in different contexts as Hurrians, Elamites, Medes, Cimmerians, and Scythians. The homeland of Umman Manda seems to be somewhere from Central Anatolia to north or northeastern Babylonia, possibly in what later came to be known as Mitanni, Mannae, or Media.
Zaluti, whose name seems to have an Indo-Iranian etymology, is mentioned as a leader of Ummanda Manda. He is even suggested to be identified with Salitis the founder of the Hyksos, the Fifteenth dynasty of Egypt.

The principal literary source is the so-called Cuthaean Legend of Naram-Sin, a composition that deals with the third-millennium BC king of Agade (Akkad) Naram-Sin and his struggles against the Umman-manda. As a literary topos, the Umman-manda represent a socio-cultural phenomenon with a strong theological basis: The Umman-manda are created by the gods and called forth from their homeland on the northeastern frontier of Mesopotamia by the chief god, be it Enlil, Marduk, or Aššur, for some particular work of destruction; since this destruction is divinely ordained, human beings are powerless to stop it, and in fact are enjoined against interfering; when the destruction is completed, the gods themselves will destroy the Umman-manda. In the literary topos, the Umman-manda is the enemy of civilization. The question of who the original Umman-manda were remains a mystery. The Cyrus Cylinder however, states that the Umman-manda were subdued by Cyrus the Great, and therefore made part of the Achaemenid Empire just before he captured Babylon in 539 BC. According to the Cyrus Cylinder: "Cyrus, king of Anšan [...] made the land of Gutium and all the Umman-manda bow in submission at his feet."

In the first millennium BC, the term denoted Cimmerians and/or Medes.

References

Bibliography
The Coming of the Greeks: Indo-European Conquests in the Aegean and the Near East, Robert Drews, Princeton University Press, 1989, 276 pages, see pages 226-230.

Ancient Near East
Ancient peoples